Jacob Rickenbaugh House is a historic home located in Hoosier National Forest, Oil Township, Perry County, Indiana.  It was built in 1874, and is a two-story, "T"-plan dwelling constructed of ashlar sandstone blocks in the late Greek Revival style.  It has a low pitched gable roof and side porches on each side of the rear ell.  From 1870 to 1961, its parlor housed the Celina Post Office.  It was acquired by the United States Forest Service in 1968.

It was listed on the National Register of Historic Places in 1984.

The house has been restored and is open regularly for self-guided tours in the spring-fall season.

See also 
List of United States post offices

References

External links 
 Rickenbaugh House - Hoosier National Forest

Historic American Buildings Survey in Indiana
Houses on the National Register of Historic Places in Indiana
Greek Revival houses in Indiana
Houses completed in 1874
Houses in Perry County, Indiana
National Register of Historic Places in Perry County, Indiana
Museums in Perry County, Indiana
Historic house museums in Indiana